Cormac O'Brien (born 2001), is an Irish hurler who plays as a defender for club side Newtownshandrum and at inter-county level with the Cork senior hurling team.

Career

O'Brien first came to prominence at juvenile and underage levels with the Newtownshandrum club before joining the club's senior team in 2019. As a schoolboy at CBS Charleville he also lined out in various hurling competitions including the Harty Cup. O'Brien first appeared on the inter-county scene as a half back on the Cork under-17 team that won the one-off All-Ireland Under-17 Championship in 2017. A year with the Cork minor team followed before he won consecutive All-Ireland Under-20 Championships in 2020 and as team captain in 2021. O'Brien joined the Cork senior hurling team as a member of the extended training panel in 2021 and made his debut in the National League against Limerick.

Career statistics

Honours

Cork
 All-Ireland Under-20 Hurling Championship: 2020, 2021 (c)
 Munster Under-20 Hurling Championship : 2020, 2021 (c)
All-Ireland Under-17 Hurling Championship: 2017
Munster Under-17 Hurling Championship: 2017

References

2001 births
Living people
Newtownshandrum hurlers
Cork inter-county hurlers